Satsuma largillierti is a species of gastropods belonging to the family Camaenidae.

The species is found in Japan.

References

Camaenidae